"Don't Believe a Word" is a song by American indie rock band Ivy. It was released in 1995 as the second single from the band's debut studio album, Realistic.

The track was released in several different packages, including as a CD single that included two B-side tracks, and as a promotional single that featured an A-side track and an acoustic remix of the single. B-side "An Ordinary" is listed as same on the actual releases, although it has also been titled "An Ordinary Man" on a band lyrics page.

Track listings and formats 

United States CD single
 "Don't Believe a Word" – 2:49
 "By Myself" – 3:15
 "An Ordinary" – 1:46

United States 7" single
 "Don't Believe a Word" – 2:47
 "By Myself" – 3:14

United States Maxi single
 "Don't Believe a Word" – 2:47
 "By Myself" – 3:14
 "An Ordinary" – 1:45

Release history

References 

Ivy (band) songs
1995 singles
1994 songs
Songs written by Dominique Durand
Songs written by Adam Schlesinger
Songs written by Andy Chase